Welden is a community in the Augsburg district of Bavaria, Germany, and is the seat of the commune of Welden. Since the local government reform in 1978 it comprises Welden, Reutern and Ehgatten.

Geography
Welden lies at the centre of the Holzwinkel landscape in Augsburg-West forestry natural park.

Welden and Ehgatten are situated on the Laugna which supplies the Zusam.  Reutern is on a hill between the Zusam and Laugna vallies.

History
Welden was first mentioned in 1156. It was seat of the Lords of Welden who took their fief from the marquesses of Burgau. In 1402 the village became a "market". In 1597 the Fugger family acquired the estate which remained in the hand of the Fugger-Wellenburg branch until it extinguished in 1764, followed by the counts and princes of Fugger-Babenhausen. In 1806 Welden became part of the Kingdom of Bavaria. The monastery is still owned by the Fugger family foundation. 

During the local government reform of 1978, the commune of Reutern was added to Welden as was Ehgatten, which belonged to the commune of Streitheim (now belonging to Zusmarshausen community). Before 1978, Ehgatten's parish and school was governed by Welden.

Politics

Mayor
Mayors since the local government reform of 1978:

Since 2002, Gerhard Groß (FWV) has been the deputy mayor.

Local Council
Local council elections since the 1978 reform:

Culture and Places of Interest

 St. Thekla church
 Church of the Annunciation of the Virgin Mary contains early frescoes by 18th century painter Matthäus Günther

Notable citizens
The author Ludwig Ganghofer spent a significant part of his childhood (1859–1865) in Welden.

References

External links
 

Augsburg (district)